The Citroën C-Métisse is a concept car which was produced by the car manufacturer Citroën. It was first introduced in the autumn of 2006 at the Paris Motor Show. It has been stated that the reason for creating such a car was to show that any hybrid car can have the same performance as any petrol or diesel-powered car.

The car is designed as a five-door 2+2 shooting brake. The first official pictures were revealed in September 2006. This is not the first time that Citroën has produced a hybrid car; in January 2006, they revealed the hybrid-powered version of the Citroën C4 alongside the hybrid-powered Peugeot 307. The car can use front-wheel, rear-wheel and all-wheel drive depending on the situation.

Specifications
0–100 km/h (0–62 mph): 6.2 s
Top Speed: 
Fuel Consumption:

See also
 List of hybrid vehicles

References

External links
 http://www.diseno-art.com/encyclopedia/concept_cars/citroen_c-metisse.html

C-Metisse
Sports cars
Coupés
Hybrid electric cars
All-wheel-drive vehicles